Lendu is a state constituency in Malacca, Malaysia, that has been represented in the Malacca State Legislative Assembly.

The state constituency was first contested in 2004 and is mandated to return a single Assemblyman to the Malacca State Legislative Assembly under the first-past-the-post voting system. , the State Assemblyman for Lendu is Sulaiman Md Ali from United Malays National Organisation (UMNO) which is part of the state's ruling coalition, Barisan Nasional (BN).

Definition 
The Lendu constituency contains the polling districts of Pekan Masjid Tanah, Durian Daun, Sungai Baru Hulu and Pekan Lendu.

Demographics

History

Polling districts
According to the gazette issued on 31 October 2022, the Lendu constituency has a total of 4 polling districts.

Representation history

Election results

References

Malacca state constituencies